The UCI Track Cycling World Championships – Men's team sprint is the team sprint competition for men held annually at the UCI Track Cycling World Championships. Since its introduction at the 1995 championships, as of 2020, France have won the gold medal on eleven occasions.

Medalists

Medal table

Notes

References

External links
Track Cycling World Championships 2016–1893 bikecult.com
World Championship, Track, Team sprint, Elite cyclingarchives.com

 
Men's team sprint
Lists of UCI Track Cycling World Championships medalists